Jonathan Hugh Gascoyne-Cecil (22 February 1939 – 22 September 2011), known as Jonathan Cecil, was an English theatre, film, and television actor.

Early life
Cecil was born in London, England, the son of Lord David Cecil and the grandson of the 4th Marquess of Salisbury. His other grandfather was the literary critic Sir Desmond MacCarthy. He was the great-grandson of the Conservative Prime Minister, The 3rd Marquess of Salisbury.

Brought up in Oxford, where his father was Goldsmith Professor of English, he was educated at Eton, where he played small parts in school plays and at New College, Oxford, where he read modern languages, specialising in French and continued with amateur dramatics.

At Oxford, his friends included Dudley Moore and Alan Bennett. In a production of Ben Jonson's Bartholomew Fair, he played a lunatic called Troubadour and a woman who sells pigs. Of his early acting at Oxford, Cecil said 

After Oxford, he spent two years training for an acting career at the London Academy of Music and Dramatic Art, where he was taught (amongst others) by Michael MacOwan and Vivian Matalon and where his contemporaries included Ian McKellen and Derek Jacobi.

Career
Cecil's first television appearance was in playing a leading role opposite Vanessa Redgrave in "Maggie", an episode of the BBC television series First Night transmitted in February 1964, which he later called "a baptism by fire because I was being seen by half the nation". After that he spent eighteen months in repertory at Salisbury, of which he later commented, "You learnt how to make an entrance and make an exit." His parts at Salisbury included the Dauphin in Saint Joan, Disraeli in Portrait of a Queen, Trinculo in The Tempest, and "all the Shakespeare".

His first West End part came in May 1965 in Julian Mitchell's dramatisation of A Heritage and Its History at the Phoenix, in which he got good notices, and his next was in a Beaumont production of Peter Ustinov's Half-Way up the Tree, directed by Sir John Gielgud.

In film and television, Cecil almost always played upper class English characters. His screen work included the roles of Cummings in The Diary of a Nobody (1964), Captain Cadbury in the Dad's Army episode "Things That Go Bump in the Night" (1973),  Bertie Wooster in Thank You, P.G. Wodehouse (1981), Ricotin in Federico Fellini's And the Ship Sails On (1983), and Captain Hastings (to Peter Ustinov's Hercule Poirot) in Thirteen at Dinner (1985), Dead Man's Folly and Murder in Three Acts (both 1986). He has been called "one of the finest upper-class-twits of his era".  In 2009 he appeared in an episode of Midsomer Murders.

He also worked in radio, where his credits included The Hitchhiker's Guide to the Galaxy and The Brightonomicon. He also appeared in The Next Programme Follows Almost Immediately, playing characters with very bad foreign accents. Additionally, he stood in for Derek Nimmo in the role of the Bishop's Chaplain, the Reverend Mervyn Noote, in the second series of the radio episodes of the ecclesiastical sitcom All Gas and Gaiters, which ran for twenty episodes. In the series of adaptations from P. G. Wodehouse What Ho! Jeeves (1973–81) he played the recurring character Bingo Little.

He narrated audio books of many of P. G. Wodehouse's books, performing voice characterisations for each character, and becoming possibly the most known narrator to ever perform the series.

Cecil wrote occasionally for The Spectator and The Times Literary Supplement. In one piece he noted 

He also admitted that "most of my experience has been in comedy, that’s the way life has taken me ... if I have any regrets, it’s that I didn’t do parts with more depth".

Personal life
Cecil was married twice. He met actress Vivien Heilbron when they were both studying at the London Academy of Music and Dramatic Art, and the couple married in 1963. They were divorced after he met the actress Anna Sharkey while appearing at London's Mermaid Theatre in 1972; he and Sharkey married in 1976.

Cecil died from pneumonia on 22 September 2011 at Charing Cross Hospital in London, aged 72. He had suffered from emphysema.

Filmography

Nothing But the Best (1964) – Guards Officer (uncredited)
The Ordeal of Richard Feverel (1964) – Giles Jinkson
The Yellow Rolls-Royce (1964) – Young Man (uncredited)
The Great St Trinian's Train Robbery (1966) – Man (uncredited)
Otley (1968) – Young Man at Party
The Rise and Rise of Michael Rimmer (1970) – Spot
Lust for a Vampire (1971) – Biggs
To Catch a Spy (1971) – British Attaché
Up the Front (1972) – Captain Nigel Phipps Fortescue
Dad's Army (1973) – Captain Cadbury
Are You Being Served (1975) – Customer 
Barry Lyndon (1975) – Lt. Jonathan Fakenham
Under the Doctor (1976) – Rodney Harrington-Harrington / Lord Woodbridge
Joseph Andrews (1977) – Fop One
Rising Damp (1980) – Boutique Assistant
History of the World, Part I (1981) – Poppinjay (The French Revolution)
Farmers Arms (1983) – Mr. Brown
And the Ship Sails On (1983) – Ricotin
The Wind in the Willows (1983) – (voice)
Thirteen at Dinner (1985) – Captain Hastings
Dead Man's Folly (1986) – Captain Hastings
Murder in Three Acts (1986) – Captain Hastings
The Second Victory (1987) – Capt. Lowell
Little Dorrit (1987) – Magnate on the Bench
Hot Paint (1988) – Earl of Lanscombe
The Fool (1990) – Sir Martin Locket
A Fine Romance (1992)
As You Like It (1992) – Lord
Day Release (1997)
RPM (1998) – Lord Baxter
Fakers (2004) – Dr Fielding
Van Wilder: The Rise of Taj (2006) – Provost Cunningham

References

External links

Jonathan Cecil, In the dressing room with Noel Coward from Times Literary Supplement of 6 February 2008, text online
Jonathan Cecil, Very much his own man, from The Spectator of 18 September 2004, text online

1939 births
2011 deaths
Male actors from London
Alumni of New College, Oxford
Alumni of the London Academy of Music and Dramatic Art
Jonathan Hugh
Deaths from pneumonia in England
English male film actors
English male television actors
English male stage actors
People educated at Eton College
People educated at The Dragon School
20th-century English male actors
21st-century English male actors